Abdoulaye Cissé (born 13 February 1996) is a Guinean professional footballer who plays as a defender for TFF First League club Tuzlaspor.

Club career
Cissé started playing as a senior in 2013 with Fello Star at Guinée Championnat National. By 2014, he was already in France and signed with Angers, having spent two seasons playing in their reserves team. In 2016, he signed with Martigues and played with them in the 2016–17 Championnat de France Amateur. In 2017, Cissé joined another French side, Schiltigheim, where he stayed until 2020.

In summer 2020, he received an invitation on behalf of his national teammate Seydouba Soumah, to come to his club, Partizan, on trials. Although he left a good impression, the foreigners limit made it hard for him to join Partizan, so he joined another Serbian top-league side, Novi Pazar. He signed a one-year contract with Novi Pazar on 3 August 2020.

International career
Cissé has been part of the Guinea national team since 2014.

References

External links
 

1994 births
Sportspeople from Conakry
Living people
Guinean footballers
Guinea international footballers
Association football defenders
Fello Star players
Angers SCO players
FC Martigues players
SC Schiltigheim players
FK Novi Pazar players
Kocaelispor footballers
Menemenspor footballers
Tuzlaspor players
Championnat National 3 players
Championnat National 2 players
Serbian SuperLiga players
TFF First League players
2015 Africa Cup of Nations players
Guinean expatriate footballers
Guinean expatriate sportspeople in France
Expatriate footballers in France
Guinean expatriate sportspeople in Serbia
Expatriate footballers in Serbia
Guinean expatriate sportspeople in Turkey
Expatriate footballers in Turkey